The Sans Souci was a nightclub within a natural environment and located seven miles outside of Havana. It had a restaurant and floor shows nightly that attracted a great number of tourists. Its greatest profits came from an amusement arcade operating in a small room next door to the Sans Souci that was not advertised since there was no official license for its exploitation.

The 1956 the Cabaret Yearbook describes the venue as "Usually run by Americans, Sans Souci Cabaret is located in a Spanish-type villa.  Stage, dance floor and tables are under the moonlight.  Shows, like at the other Big Three nightclubs, are production numbers with name acts.  Good-looking U.S. showgirls are an added attraction.  Sans Souci, as well as Tropicana and Montmartre, has a gambling room with roulette, craps and chemin de fer, etc. Located even further out than Tropicana, Sans Souci usually opens only for the winter season."

Remodel

Remodeling of the Sans Souci Cabaret started in 1955 at an approximate cost of one million dollars. The management of Norman “Roughneck” Rothman, a mafia associate who was married to the Cuban Olga Chaviano, a star at the Sans Souci between 1953 and 1955, preceded the management of William G. Buschoff, known as Lefty Clark, from Miami Beach; one of the men of Santo Trafficante Jr. A report by the Department of the Treasury written in Havana considered Buschoff a suspect of drug trafficking; Santo Trafficante was also a suspect.

Razzle game

Sometime in 1952 the venue installed a razzle game, a scam that had sometimes been presented as a gambling game on carnival midways. The player throws a number of marbles onto a grid of holes, and the numbers of those holes award points which it is suggested can be converted into prizes. In reality, it is almost impossible for a player to win enough points for the prize, but this is concealed by the game's unintuitive use of probability, and deceptive behavior on the part of the operator. Jay Mallin records the game being played with eight dice instead of marbles and holes, in Cuban nightclubs and casinos in the 1950s.

Gallery

See also

Havana Plan Piloto
Havana Conference

Notes

References

Buildings and structures in Havana
Nightclubs
Tourist attractions in Havana
Nightclubs in Havana